Jorgensen may refer to:

 Jorgensen, a common Danish-Norwegian surname
 Jorgensen Center
 Jorgensen's General Store, American historical site in Grant-Valkaria, Florida
 R. v. Jorgensen, a Canadian legal decision by the Supreme Court of Canada

See also
 
 Jorgenson